A virga is an observable streak or shaft of precipitation.

Virga may also refer to:

Virga (butterfly), genus of butterflies
Virga parish, parish in Priekule municipality, Latvia
The Virga series, a science fiction series by Karl Schroeder
Virga Jesse Basilica, church in Belgium
An obsolete unit of length, proposed by Gabriel Mouton

People with the surname
Valerio Virga (born 1986), Italian footballer
Vincenzo Virga (born 1936), Italian mob boss

See also
Virgo (disambiguation)
Viagra